Fencing competitions at the Beijing 2008 Summer Olympics were held from August 9 to August 17 at the Olympic Green Convention Center.

Medal summary

Medal table

Men's events

Women's events

Events 
10 sets of medals were awarded in the following events:
Individual Épée Men
Individual Épée Women
Individual Foil Men
Individual Foil Women
Individual Sabre Men
Individual Sabre Women
Team Épée Men
Team Foil Women
Team Sabre Men
Team Sabre Women

Competition format
The Fencing competition at the Olympic Games consists of a single elimination tournament.  
The 2 losers in the semifinal will fence for the bronze medal.

Qualification

Participating nations

See also 
Wheelchair fencing at the 2008 Summer Paralympics

References 
Qualifications for the 2008 OG before the NOCs confirmation
Federation Internationale D'Escrime
Competition Information on the Official Website of the Beijing 2008 Summer Olympics

External links
Fencing – Official Results Book

 
2008 Summer Olympics events
2008
2008 in fencing
International fencing competitions hosted by China